New Lambton is a village in County Durham, England, although the postal address is Tyne and Wear.

References

Villages in County Durham